Eupithecia senorita is a moth in the family Geometridae that can be found in France and Spain.

References

External links

Moths described in 2003
senorita
Moths of Europe